Mohegan Pennsylvania (formerly Mohegan Sun Pocono, Pocono Downs and Mohegan Sun at Pocono Downs) is a racino located in Plains Township on the outskirts of Wilkes-Barre, Pennsylvania.  The casino features over 2,300 slots, live tables for blackjack, roulette and poker, and a sportsbook offering sports betting.  A ⅝-mile (1-kilometer) harness track is also a major attraction.

History
The racetrack itself is as of 2015 now called The Downs At Mohegan Sun Pocono.

Mohegan Sun acquired the Pocono Downs racetrack on January 25, 2005 in a $280 million purchase of the Pocono Downs Racetrack from Penn National Gaming. Mohegan Sun renamed the property "Mohegan Sun at Pocono Downs," and began a major expansion.  It began operation in November 2006 as the first slots casino in the state of Pennsylvania.

In January 2010, then Governor Ed Rendell signed a bill to legalize table games in Pennsylvania.  The Mohegan Sun casino was among the first to receive approval for table games, and planned to hire 600 new employees for the expansion.  Table games began operation on July 13, 2010.

In November 2013, Mohegan Sun opened a hotel that is connected to the casino floor.

On January 28, 2019, Mohegan Sun Pocono signed a partnership with Kindred Group to begin sports betting at a sportsbook at the casino along with offering online gambling and sports betting. Mohegan Sun Pocono became the first casino in Northeastern Pennsylvania to offer sports betting. On March 29, 2019, Mohegan Sun Pocono applied for a sports betting license; the license was approved on May 15, 2019. The casino constructed a  sportsbook that contains a video wall, 7 sports betting terminals, and 3 teller windows. The Unibet Sportsbook at Mohegan Sun Pocono opened on October 5, 2019, with former National Football League and Penn State linebacker LaVar Arrington in attendance for the ribbon-cutting ceremony. Unibet launched online gambling and online sports betting on November 12, 2019.

On March 18, 2020, Carmine Fusco, who trained and raced horses at The Downs at Poccono Downs, became the first resident of Pennsylvania to die from Coronavirus disease 2019.

Features

Dining and shopping

The facility has fourteen restaurants or food service areas, including a food court, Johnny Rockets, Ruth's Chris Steak House, and Rustic Kitchen

There are also four shops, including a wine and cheese shop.

Off-track wagering
Mohegan Sun also owns off-track betting facility/sportsbook in  Allentown.

Gallery

See also
List of casinos in Pennsylvania 
List of casinos in the United States 
List of casino hotels

References

External links
Official Site
Off Track Wagering site

Casinos in Pennsylvania
Sports venues completed in 1965
Casinos completed in 2006
Buildings and structures in Luzerne County, Pennsylvania
Tourist attractions in Luzerne County, Pennsylvania
Horse racing venues in Pennsylvania
1965 establishments in Pennsylvania